The  is a diesel-electric multiple unit (DEMU) train type operated by East Japan Railway Company (JR East) around Niigata and Akita areas of Japan from 2019.

Design
The GV-E400 series trains are the first diesel-electric multiple units (not including hybrid train) to be operated by JR East, with diesel engines driving generators, which in turn power electric traction motors. The trains have stainless steel bodies and a maximum speed of 100 km/h (62 mph).

Operations

The GV-E400 series trains are scheduled to be used on the following lines.
Niigata area (from FY2019)
 Uetsu Main Line (Nigata and Yamagata Prefectures)
Shinetsu Main Line (Nigata Prefecture)
 Yonesaka Line (Nigata and Yamagata Prefectures)
Banetsu West Line (Nigata and Fukushima Prefectures)
Akita area (from FY2020)
 Tsugaru Line (Aomori Prefecture)
Gono Line (Akita and Aomori Prefectures)
Ou Main Line (Akita and Aomori Prefectures)

Formations
The trains are formed as single-car units classified GV-E400 and two-car units classified GV-E401 + GV-E402.

History
Details of the new trains were announced by JR East on 4 July 2017. A total of 63 vehicles are scheduled to be built, entering service in the Niigata area from 2019, and in the Akita area from 2020.

One single-car unit and one two-car unit were delivered from the Kawasaki Heavy Industries factory in Kobe in January 2018 for test-running and evaluation.

The first train entered service on 19 August 2019.

Fleet
The depots and deliveries dates for the fleet are as shown below.

See also
 H100 series, a JR Hokkaido DEMU based on the GV-E400 series design

References

External links

 JR East press release 

400 series
East Japan Railway Company
Train-related introductions in 2019
Kawasaki multiple units